"I Won't Let You Go" is a song by Swedish singer Agnetha Fältskog, released as the lead single from her second English solo studio album, Eyes of a Woman (1985). The song was composed by Fältskog with lyrics by producer Eric Stewart, formerly of the group 10cc.

The track reached number one in Denmark and the top 10 in Sweden and Belgium, while peaking at number 84 in the United Kingdom.

The B-side of the single, "You're There", was also written by Fältskog and was the last song written by her to be released until "I Keep Them On The Floor Beside My Bed", which was the closing track on her 2013 album, A.

In some countries, a 12-inch single was released that featured an extended remix instead of the album version.

Charts

Year-end charts

References

1985 singles
1985 songs
Agnetha Fältskog songs
Number-one singles in Denmark
Polar Music singles
Song recordings produced by Eric Stewart
Songs written by Agnetha Fältskog
Songs written by Eric Stewart